The China–Moldova relations are the bilateral relationships between the People's Republic of China and the Republic of Moldova.

China recognized the independence of Moldova on Dec 27th, 1991. Bilateral relationships between China and Moldova were established in Jan 30th, 1992. Then in June, 1992, China opened the Embassy of the People's Republic of China in Chişinău while Moldova opened the Embassy of Moldova in Beijing in Mar, 1996.

Now China is helping training technicians from Moldova.

During the worldwide COVID-19 pandemic, China donated 150,000 doses of the Sinopharm BIBP vaccine and sold another 100,000 to Moldova.

See also 
 Foreign relations of China 
 Foreign relations of Moldova

References 

 
Moldova
China